Spiderweb (1976) is a British short film directed by National Film and Television School graduate Paul Miller. It is a fairly faithful adaptation of "Death and the Compass", a 1942 short story by Argentine writer Jorge Luis Borges (1899-1986). The site of the action, an unnamed city in the original story, is given as "Borgesia" at the beginning of the film.

Spiderweb is available as an "Extra" on the DVD of Alex Cox's 1996 Death and the Compass, a later adaptation of the same short-story.

External links
 Paul Miller's Spiderweb (1976) - artist's archive

1976 films
Adaptations of works by Jorge Luis Borges
British drama short films
1976 drama films
1970s English-language films
1970s British films